"The Choad Less Traveled" is the fourth episode of the American superhero television series Peacemaker, a spin-off from the 2021 film The Suicide Squad. The episode was written by series creator James Gunn and directed by Jody Hill. It originally aired on HBO Max on January 20, 2022.

The series is set after the events of The Suicide Squad, and follows Christopher Smith / Peacemaker. Smith returns to his home but is forced to work with A.R.G.U.S. agents on a classified operation only known as "Project Butterfly". Smith also has to deal with his personal demons, including feeling haunted by memories of people he killed for "peace", as well as reconnecting with his estranged father. In the episode, Smith discovers that the team framed his father for his actions, creating tensions among the team. Meanwhile, Chase decides to infiltrate the prison to kill Auggie, thinking Smith will be better off without him.

The episode received positive reviews from critics, who praised the writing, performances, character development and twist ending.

Plot
The team takes Judomaster to their headquarters at the abandoned video store. As the team re-organizes, Smith and Chase drive to Auggie's house to recover more helmets.

After retrieving the helmets, Smith is told by his father's neighbor that Auggie has been framed for his actions and is now in prison. Smith confronts Murn about having orchestrated his father's arrest and despite his insistence, Smith decides to go visit Auggie in prison, although Murn assigns Adebayo to talk him down. In prison, Auggie is angered at the actions of his framing and intends to reveal Project Butterfly to get released. Outside, Adebayo and Chase talk about Auggie, with Adebayo suggesting that Smith would be better off without him. Inspired by this, Chase gets himself arrested by throwing a trash can into a window in front of many police officers.

Smith and Adebayo return to the headquarters and discover that Judomaster has escaped. In the parking lot, Smith fights with Judomaster. As Judomaster is about to reveal vital information on the Butterflies, Adebayo shoots him in the chest. As Judomaster is once again restrained in the headquarters, Smith leaves for his trailer home. Murn discovers that Chase has been arrested and Abedayo might have suggested that he should kill Auggie. Economos hacks into the prison's database in order to release him. In prison, Chase meets with Auggie and his gang, trying to provoke him but Auggie does not fall for it and thinks Smith wants him killed. Chase is later bailed out and picked up by Harcourt.

At his trailer home, Smith is haunted by the memories of people he killed, including his brother and Rick Flag. That night, Adebayo finds evidence regarding a company and calls Murn to meet with her. Murn agrees to meet her, but is seen consuming a liquid in a bowl with an enlarged tongue, revealing himself to be a Butterfly.

Production

Development
In July 2021, it was announced that Jody Hill would direct an episode of the series.

Writing
The episode revealed the "White Dragon" suit, worn by Auggie to commit crimes in the past. Executive producer Peter Safran praised Gunn's version of the suit, also adding, "Everything we did is the same as the way we would do it if we were making the film version of White Dragon, or the film version of Vigilante."

While James Gunn said that HBO Max was supportive of his vision of the series, executives took a problem with the scene where Smith verbally insults Batman, particularly calling him "a pussy". Gunn defended the decision, stating that the character is known for his provocative nature and made far worse insults to other superhero characters. Gunn also agreed with Smith's point of view of Batman, explaining "everybody else he's really just believing stuff that he read on the Internet. Everything that he believes is kind of nonsense, and Batman is the only one he has a point of view on that makes any sense whatsoever."

Critical reception
"The Choad Less Traveled" received positive reviews from critics. Samantha Nelson of IGN gave the episode a "good" 7 out of 10 rating and wrote in his verdict, "Peacemakers big twist isn't really that surprising and the show's attempts to make Vigilante and Peacemaker more sympathetic fall a bit short. But meta rants about superheroes, entertaining fights, and the general dysfunction of the team helps keep the show fun even if the plot is unfolding slowly."

Jarrod Jones of The A.V. Club gave the episode an "A-" grade and wrote, "'The Choad Less Traveled' is a dramatic peak for Peacemaker, especially in its final moments where Chris gets wasted with Eagly and the butterfly he plucked from Senator Goff's sci-fi basement last week." Alec Bojalad of Den of Geek gave the episode a 4 star rating out of 5 and wrote, "Peacemaker is somehow halfway through its eight-episode run already. While it has its flaws (Judomaster was perhaps one obscure DC character too many), this remains a truly worthwhile TV endeavor. Now let's see what's up with Murn: secret butterfly."

Mashable SEA ranked the episode the 17th best episode of 2022.

Notes

References

External links
 

Peacemaker (TV series) episodes
2022 American television episodes
Television episodes written by James Gunn